Montrose is a census-designated place (CDP) in Henrico County, Virginia, United States. The population was 7,909 at the 2020 census.

Geography
Montrose is located at  (37.520646, −77.378212).

Demographics

2020 census

Note: the US Census treats Hispanic/Latino as an ethnic category. This table excludes Latinos from the racial categories and assigns them to a separate category. Hispanics/Latinos can be of any race.

2000 Census
As of the census of 2000, there were 7,018 people, 2,924 households, and 1,850 families residing in the CDP. The population density was 2,062.4 people per square mile (797.0/km2). There were 3,081 housing units at an average density of 905.4/sq mi (349.9/km2). The racial makeup of the CDP was 46.48% White, 49.97% African American, 0.36% Native American, 1.01% Asian, 0.88% from other races, and 1.30% from two or more races. Hispanic or Latino of any race were 1.57% of the population.

There were 2,924 households, out of which 34.3% had children under the age of 18 living with them, 33.9% were married couples living together, 24.8% had a female householder with no husband present, and 36.7% were non-families. 29.9% of all households were made up of individuals, and 9.1% had someone living alone who was 65 years of age or older. The average household size was 2.40 and the average family size was 2.97.

In the CDP, the population was spread out, with 27.4% under the age of 18, 10.3% from 18 to 24, 32.9% from 25 to 44, 19.6% from 45 to 64, and 9.7% who were 65 years of age or older. The median age was 33 years. For every 100 females, there were 82.9 males. For every 100 females age 18 and over, there were 75.8 males.

The median income for a household in the CDP was $36,433, and the median income for a family was $42,031. Males had a median income of $30,903 versus $24,966 for females. The per capita income for the CDP was $17,259. About 9.8% of families and 11.9% of the population were below the poverty line, including 18.0% of those under age 18 and 10.6% of those age 65 or over.

References

Census-designated places in Henrico County, Virginia
Census-designated places in Virginia